Penticton Secondary School (Pen High or PSS) is a high school located in Penticton, British Columbia, Canada.  PSS is operated by School District 67 Okanagan Skaha.  It is one of two secondary schools in Penticton and one of three in the school district.  It is located on the same campus as the Okanagan School of the Arts.  The school district's French immersion classes for grades 9-12 are located at the school.

Academic programs
In addition to standard core curriculum programs, Advanced Placement courses are offered which can be used for credit at universities and colleges.  Other programs offered include:
 Applied Skills
 Athletics & PE
 Business
 Fine Arts
 Languages

Hockey Academy
The school is involved with the Okanagan Hockey School in a private-public partnership at the Okanagan Hockey Academy (OHA).  Students traveling to Penticton to enroll in the OHA are eligible to take academic courses at PenHigh while PenHigh students receive hockey training and practice from the OHA.  Students are also eligible to play on the OHA's competitive teams.

Music
The school's music program offers:
 Concert Band
 Senior Band
 Senior Jazz
 Concert Choir
 Guitar
 Recording Arts

History and facilities
Penticton High School opened on the current site in 1913 in the Ellis building, and in 1921 expanded into the new Shatford building, named after the recently deceased former Member of the Legislative Assembly in British Columbia and later Senator Lytton Shatford.  Shatford's company had purchased the Ellis estate on whose land the school would be established.  The buildings have also been known as the Ellis School and the Shatford School, respectively.

Numerous renovations and expansions occurred from the 1940s on.  A new facility was constructed on the same campus during 2006-2008 at a capital cost of $38 million.  The school district agreed to maintain the Ellis building, which was upgraded and incorporated into the new school at a cost of $3.1 million, and the city took responsibility for the Shatford building.  The new building's design incorporated energy efficient strategies, including a geothermal heating system.

The Shatford Centre is one of two heritage buildings on the PSS campus.  Its renovation was completed in 2011 and was funded by the school district, the local, provincial, and federal governments, and other public and private entities.  The Shatford building has been renamed The Shatford Centre which operates as a conference centre and events facility, and houses the Okanagan School of the Arts.

The graduation of the class of 1975 was the topic of the 
short NFB documentary Pen-Hi Grad by Sandy Wilson.

Notable alumni
Brett Hull, NHL hockey player
Paul Kariya, retired NHL hockey player
Duncan Keith, NHL hockey player
Brendan Morrison, NHL hockey player
Troy Stetcher, NHL hockey player
Sandy Wilson, film director
Mike Reno, Musician
Mattias Clement, aka Tyler Breeze, Professional Wrestler

References

External links
Fraser Institute School Report Card
Okanagan Hockey Academy
Okanagan Hockey School
Penticton Western News article on enrollment, April 7, 2011
Photos of the Ellis and Shatford buildings (post renovation)
Pen High 100 Committee webpage
Canada's Historic Places, Penticton High School webpage
Penticton Secondary School's Legacy

High schools in British Columbia
Buildings and structures in Penticton
Schools in the Okanagan
Educational institutions established in 1913
1913 establishments in British Columbia